During the 1998–99 English football season, Southampton Football Club competed in the FA Premier League.

Season summary
An embarrassing 5–0 defeat at the hands of Premiership debutants Charlton Athletic at The Valley in Southampton's second league game prompted a horrendous start to which would set the tone for a long season for The Saints, seeing them lose their first five games and gaining just two points from their first nine games and winning just three out of their first 20 games, picking up just 14 points from a possible 60. Form gradually improved from mid-December but was ultimately inconsistent and they would not lose again at home after their 2–0 home defeat by Chelsea on Boxing Day. However, their away form continued to be poor; this meant that - in addition to not being helped by their poor start - they were in the relegation zone all season long until April, when a late run of good form saw the Saints draw two and win their final three games and saved them from relegation at the expense of Charlton Athletic. Winning their final game of the season was a double delight, not only because they had attained survival, but because it meant that they would be able to press ahead with a move to a new 32,000-seat stadium on the banks of the River Itchen, knowing that they would only have to play two more seasons at their dilapidated century-old Dell before making the long-awaited move to a capacious new home.

Final league table

Results summary

Results by round

Results
Southampton's score comes first

Legend

FA Premier League

FA Cup

League Cup

Squad

Left club during season

Statistics

Appearances, goals and cards
(Starting appearances + substitute appearances)

Transfers

In

Out

Transfers in:  £5,330,000
Transfers out:  £9,100,000
Total spending:  £3,770,000

References

Southampton F.C. seasons
Southampton